Bai Yang may refer to:

Bai Yang (actress) (1920–1996), Chinese actress
Bo Yang (1920–2008), also known as Bai Yang, Chinese/Taiwanese scholar, writer and politician
Bai Yang (table tennis) (born 1984), Chinese table tennis player
Bai Yang (footballer) (born 1998), Chinese footballer

See also
Baiyang (disambiguation)
Bai Yan (disambiguation)